The KPGA Tour Championship is a professional golf tournament on the Korean Tour. It has generally been played in November, one of the last events of the season. The 2018 event was played at Lake Hills Golf Club in Anseong, South Korea.

Winners

Source:

References

Korean Tour events
Golf tournaments in South Korea
Recurring sporting events established in 2005
2005 establishments in South Korea